Dendrocoelidae is a family of freshwater tricladida flatworms that has a holarctic distribution.

The largest freshwater triclad known belongs to this family, it's up to 40 cm in length and inhabits the Lake Baikal.

Description 
The family Dendrocoelidae is characterized by an unusual arrangement of the muscle layers of the pharynx. While in most planarians the inner musculature of the pharynx is composed of two muscle layers, one circular and one longitudinal, in Dendrocoelidae the circular and longitudinal fibers are intermingled, forming a mixed layer.

Dendrocoelidae is the sister group of Kenkiidae. Both families have an anterior adhesive organ, which is considered a synapomorphy of the group.

Genera 
The following genera are recognised in the family Dendrocoelidae:

Genus Acromyadenium 
Genus Alaoplana 
Genus Amyadenium 
Genus Anocelis 
Genus Archicotylus 
Genus Armilla 
Genus Atria 
Genus Baikalobia 
Genus Baikalocotylus 
Genus Baikaloplana 
Genus Bdellocephala 
Genus Caspioplana 
Genus Dendrocoelopsis 
Genus Dendrocoelum 
Genus Hyperbulbina 
Genus Hyperpapillina 
Genus Microarchicotylus 
Genus Miodendrocoelum 
Genus Papilloplana 
Genus Polycladodes 
Genus Procotyla 
Genus Protocotylus 
Genus Rimacephalus 
Genus Sorocelis

Phylogeny 
Phylogenetic supertree after Sluys et al., 2009:

References 

 
Platyhelminthes families